Cheap Monday was a Swedish clothing label. It was founded in 2004 by Örjan Andersson and Adam Friberg, originally as a second-hand clothing store, in a suburb of Stockholm. The clothes started selling on March 10, 2004, and from the beginning in only one store called Weekday. The name of the brand derived from the fact that the original store was only open on Sunday. The brand was known for their idiosyncratic designs, and expanded from their original focus on jeans to include sneakers, flannel, and shirts.

Cheap Monday clothes were distributed in a variety of stores worldwide, including Urban Outfitters and Barneys New York. They were also available from a range of online stores, including The Iconic, SurfStitch and ASOS. Apart from franchisees, Cheap Monday had four stand-alone stores in London, Paris, Beijing and Shenyang. Several pop-up stores were also established, in Stockholm, Utrecht, Los Angeles and Hong Kong.

Their logo of a skull originally included an inverted crucifix. The designers of the logo, Björn Atldax and Karl Grandin of the design group Vår, meant it as an anti-Christian statement, citing the religion as the cause of many wars. By January 2010, the logo was altered with the inverted crucifix replaced by a single vertical line.

Acquisition
On March 6, 2008 it was announced that retailer H & M Hennes & Mauritz AB (H&M) would acquire the company Fabric Scandinavien AB, maker of Cheap Monday jeans and operator of the Weekday store. H&M bought 60 percent of Fabric Scandinavien for 564 million Swedish kronor (US$92 million at the time) from the founders of the company: Adam Friberg, Lars Karlsson, Örjan Andersson and Linda Friberg. H&M has "the possibility/obligation to acquire the remaining shares in the company within three to five years."

Closure
As of November 2018, H&M announced that they would be closing their Cheap Monday brand due to poor sales. The closure of the business was completed in June 2019.

References

External links
Official website

Swedish brands
Clothing brands of Sweden
Clothing companies of Sweden
2000 introductions
Clothing companies established in 2000
2000 establishments in Sweden
Companies based in Stockholm
Clothing brands of Stockholm
Clothing retailers of Sweden
Multinational companies headquartered in Sweden